Deganwy (Middle Welsh Degannwy, Brythonic *Decantouion) is a town and electoral ward in Conwy County Borough in Wales with a population of 3,936 (2011). It lies in the Creuddyn Peninsula alongside Llandudno (to the north) and Rhos-on-Sea (to its east). Historically part of Caernarfonshire, the peninsula is in a region of north Wales where as many as 1 in 3 of residents are able to speak Welsh, and is home to some of the most expensive streets in Wales. Deganwy is located to the east of the town of Conwy (which is on the opposite side of the River Conwy) and with it forms the Conwy community.  The name Deganwy has been interpreted in modern times as Din-Gonwy, which would mean "Fort on the River Conwy", but the historical spellings make it impossible for this to be the actual origin of the name although mentioned in Domesday Book is "the territory of the Decanae tribe". The original wooden castle was rebuilt in stone after 1210. Deganwy is in the ecclesiastical parish of Llanrhos, and has a Victorian era Gothic parish church dedicated to All Saints.

The built-up area of Deganwy and Llandudno Junction had a population of 10,658.

Deganwy Castle
Deganwy's most notable feature is Deganwy Castle, situated 110 m above the town, which, in the 6th century was fortified as the stronghold of Maelgwn Gwynedd, king of Gwynedd. Deganwy appears to have been the capital of Gwynedd at this time, but this was later moved to Aberffraw on Anglesey. The hill on which the castle was built was fortified many times over the centuries. It was the site of a Norman castle built around 1082 and occupied by Robert of Rhuddlan, and later by Llywelyn the Great and Llywelyn ap Gruffudd. The castle was later demolished by Llywelyn ap Gruffydd in 1263 so that only ruins remain today.

Rail and sea

Deganwy has a railway station on the Llandudno branch line with an hourly train service, available on request, to and from Manchester Piccadilly and intermediate stations. The London & North Western Railway built at Deganwy a rail-connected riverside quay and wharfs, largely for the purpose of exporting slate by coastal steamer. The slate was brought by rail from Blaenau Ffestiniog. A marina with its accompanying housing and hotel accommodation was established on the site of the former slate wharfs early in the 21st century.

Governance
Deganwy electoral ward elects two county councillors to Conwy County Borough Council and four town councillors to Conwy Town Council.

Education
Deganwy has one bilingual primary school, Ysgol Deganwy.

See also
All Saints Church, Deganwy

Footnotes

External links

  Deganwy Quay - photographic tour
 www.geograph.co.uk : photos of Deganwy and surrounding area

Towns in Conwy County Borough
Wards of Conwy County Borough
Conwy